Dolynske is a Ukrainian place name which can refer to the following villages:
 Dolynske, Reni Raion
 Dolynske, Zaporizhia Raion
 Dolynske, Melitopol Raion former German colony of Johannesruh

See also
 Dolinsky (disambiguation)